Srinivasan (popularly known as Powerstar and sometimes simply Power) is an Indian actor, doctor, politician and comedian, producer, singer, business man who has worked in the Tamil film industry. Beginning his career as a medical practitioner, he moved into finance before embarking on making films starring himself. He then appeared in N. Santhanam's Kanna Laddu Thinna Aasaiya (2013) which gave him a breakthrough in receiving further offers for comedic roles.

Career 
Srinivasan completed his degree at Madurai Kamaraj University and then acquired a qualification as an acupressure practitioner from a university in China through a distance education programme, before commencing practise soon after. His passion for the film industry brought him to Chennai, where he set up a finance firm, Baba Trading Company, in Anna Nagar and advertised through brokers that he would help businessmen acquire huge bank loans. Srinivasan soon went on to direct and star in a film titled Lathika, which released in 2011 with little publicity and featured primarily newcomers. The following year, the team of Lathika put up banners across vast areas in Chennai, remarking that Lathika had been successfully running for 220 days in the city albeit at a single cinema. The move brought him publicity and he gained online fan clubs for the bizarre claims, while he also went on to rechristen himself as 'Powerstar' Srinivasan. Srinivasan subsequently begun several other production ventures starring himself including Ananda Thollai, Indrasena, Abhinava and Desiya Nedunchalai, though most films remain partially shot. Srinivasan inadvertently had marketed himself as a spoof artist through his initial ploys and has since maintained a comic image with the media and on-screen, often portraying outrageous and over-the-top characters.

Actor Santhanam offered him a pivotal role in his first production Kanna Laddu Thinna Aasaiya (2013), to portray one of the three leading male roles. The film opened to positive reviews in January 2013, with critics calling it an "infectious" comedy and went on to do profitable business at the box office. Alongside his co-stars, critics noted that Srinivasan "scorches the screen" and his "comic timing makes the slapstick madness work". The success of the film garnered him offers from big productions, including Bala's Paradesi (2013) and  Shankar's I; though his portions were later replaced in the former film.

Srinivasan has since gone on to appear in supporting roles in smaller budget films, notably playing pivotal characters in Arya Surya and Summa Nachunu Irukku (2013). He has also regularly appeared in promotional videos and single scene appearances in films, with small-time filmmakers keen to sell their films using his popular image. In early 2014, Srinivasan stated that he was unhappy that filmmakers were "betraying" him and depicting him in films. He delivered particular criticism to the makers of Ya Ya (2013) and Goli Soda (2014), who he argued used his presence in their films for cheap publicity.

Personal life 
Srinivasan was born in 1962 in the Simmakal region in Madurai, Tamil Nadu. After leaving Madurai for Chennai, he bought and currently lives in a residence in Anna Nagar. He has been married twice, firstly with Vijaya of Madurai, whom he later divorced before marrying Julie from Anna Nagar. He has a daughter named Lathika, who he named his first production after.

Through his finance firm, Baba Trading Company, Srinivasan allegedly obtained over Rs. 7 crore rupees from unsuspecting businessmen and consequently used the money to begin a career in films, through his home production Lathika (2011). In 2012, Srinivasan  was arrested by the Kilpauk police on charges of cheating and released on bail. The following year in April 2013, he was booked by the Central Crime Branch (CCB) and sent to prison and the development of more cases against him led to his office in Anna Nagar and a hospital he owned on Park Road, Anna Nagar West Extension, being shut. After a period in Delhi prison, he received bail in October 2013.

Politics 
Powerstar Srinivasan joined Tamil Maanila Katchi  in 2015 at an event organised by the party.Srinivasan joined Bharatiya Janata Party on 2016 along with his wife. Later, he joined Republican Party of India and contested in the Lok Sabha elections in 2019 and the party RPI joined with Makkal Needhi Maiam. However, he lost to Thamizhachi Thangapandian, a DMK candidate to a margin of 1,73,272 votes in South Chennai.

He announced in 2020 that if actor Rajinikanth started his own political party he will also start a party and contest in 2021 Tamil Nadu Election.He rejoined BJP. He was kidnapped by unknown persons for financial reasons and for some publicity stunt.

Filmography

Television

References

External links 
 

Male actors from Madurai
Living people
Male actors in Tamil cinema
21st-century Indian male actors
Indian male comedians
Indian male film actors
Tamil comedians
Tamil male actors
Indian Tamil people
Film producers from Tamil Nadu
Television personalities from Tamil Nadu
1956 births